Isaac English (born 12 November 1971) is a Scottish former professional footballer.

A forward, English began his career with St Mirren in the 1980s. He was unable to break into the first team and moved to Partick Thistle in 1989. He made over 100 league appearances for the Jags and scored fifteen goals in six years.

He went on to play for six other clubs – including a return to Partick in 1999 – before hanging up his boots with Dumbarton in 2004.

References

1971 births
Living people
Footballers from Paisley, Renfrewshire
Scottish footballers
Association football forwards
St Mirren F.C. players
Partick Thistle F.C. players
St Johnstone F.C. players
Ayr United F.C. players
Stranraer F.C. players
Stenhousemuir F.C. players
Hamilton Academical F.C. players
Dumbarton F.C. players
Scottish Football League players